The Confederation of Unions for Professional and Managerial Staff in Finland (Akava) is a trade union confederation in Finland representings employees with university-level, professional or other high-level training. It has 36 affiliated unions with a combined membership of 611,000.

Akava is a central organization i.e. the individual members are not personally members of Akava but of a trade union which is a member of Akava. The Finnish Police Union (SJPL) is also affiliated.

On 25 October 2011 Sture Fjäder was elected President of Akava for a four-year term.
Akava is affiliated with the International Trade Union Confederation, the Council of Nordic Trade Unions, and the European Trade Union Confederation.

Akava is one of the three central organizations representing Finnish employees, the other two being the Finnish Confederation of Salaried Employees (STTK) and the Central Organisation of Finnish Trade Unions (SAK).

References

External links
 

International Trade Union Confederation
Trade Union Advisory Committee to the OECD
European Trade Union Confederation
Council of Nordic Trade Unions
Trade unions established in 1950